Manali is a town, near Kullu town in Kullu district in the Indian state of Himachal Pradesh. It is situated in the northern end of the Kullu Valley, formed by the Beas River. With a population of 8,096 people recorded in the 2011 Indian census Manali is the beginning of an ancient trade route through Lahaul (H.P) and Ladakh, over the Karakoram Pass and onto Yarkand and Hotan in the Tarim Basin of China. Manali is a popular tourist destination in India and serves as the gateway to the Lahaul and Spiti district as well as the city of Leh in Ladakh.

History 
Manali is named after the Sanātanī lawgiver Manu (see Manusmriti). The name Manali is regarded as the derivative of Manu-Alaya. In Hindu cosmology, Manu is believed to have stepped off his ark in Manali to recreate human life after a great flood had deluged the world. The Kullu Valley in which Manali is situated is often referred to as the "Valley of the Gods". An old village in the town has an ancient temple dedicated to the sage Manu.

Geography

Demographics
Manali has grown from a trading village to a small town. As of the 2011 census of India, its population was 8,096. In 2001, Manali had an official population of 6,265. Males constituted 64% of the population and females 36%. Manali had an average literacy rate of 74%, male literacy was 80%, and female literacy was 63.9%. 9.5% of the population was under six years of age.

Weather

Manali features a subtropical highland climate (Cfb) with warm summers, relatively cold winters, and a high diurnal temperature variation.

Manali experiences snowfall predominantly between December and the beginning of March.

Transport

Air 
The nearest airport Kullu–Manali Airport (IATA code KUU) is at Bhuntar town in Kullu. The airport is also known as Kullu-Manali airport and has more than a kilometer-long runway. Air India has regular flights to the airport from New Delhi.

Helicopter taxi service 
Pawan Hans, the Government charter agency, provides heli-taxi service connecting Shimla to Chandigarh, Kullu, Kangra and Dharamshala.

Road 

Manali can be reached from Delhi by national highway NH 1 up to Ambala and from there NH 22 to Chandigarh and from there by national highway NH21 that passes through Bilaspur, Sundernagar, Mandi and Kullu towns. Bus services are available from HRTC (Himachal Road Transport Corporation), HPTDC (Himachal Tourism Development Corporation), and private operators.

Railway 
There is no close railhead available close to Manali. The nearest narrow gauge railhead is at Joginder Nagar. The Kalka–Shimla Railway is a nostalgic narrow-gauge route culminating at the state capital of Shimla wherefrom one has to travel by road to Manali.

Environmental concerns 
Manali has witnessed a flurry of activity related to hydroelectric power and tourism. Unplanned and rampant construction has led to severe depletion of forests and pollution of river bodies, along with garbage being disposed of on the side of the mountains. There has been a loss of habitat to various species of fauna, not limited to the Himalayan monal, incidentally the state bird of Uttarakhand.

See also
 Tourism in Himachal Pradesh
 List of hill stations in India
 Mall Road, Manali
 Rohtang Pass, Manali

Further reading
Verma, V. 1996. Gadd of Dhauladhar: A Transhumant Tribe of the Himalayas. Indus Publishing Co., New Delhi.
Handa, O. C. 1996. Buddhist Monasteries in Himachal Pradesh. .
Penelope Chetwode 1972, 1989  "Kulu: The End of the Habitable World" Time Books International

References

External links 

 Himachal Tourism Official Govt Website
 https://hpkullu.nic.in/

Tourism in Himachal Pradesh
Hill stations in Himachal Pradesh
Ski areas and resorts in India
Cities and towns in Kullu district